Dauda Abasama I was a Sultan of Kano who reigned in 1565.

Biography in the Kano Chronicle
Below is a biography of Dauda Abasama I from Palmer's 1908 English translation of the Kano Chronicle.

References

Monarchs of Kano